Checking Out is a 1988 American comedy film, directed by David Leland and starring Jeff Daniels.

Plot
Ray Macklin is obsessed with his own mortality.  When a close friend suddenly dies of a heart attack at a barbecue, Ray becomes convinced that every ache, pain and twinge he experiences is a sign of his own impending death.  His unjustified fears lead him into ever more extensive hypochondria.

Cast
 Jeff Daniels as Ray Macklin
 Melanie Mayron as Jenny Macklin
 Michael Tucker as Harry Lardner
 Kathleen York as Diana
 Ann Magnuson as Connie Hagen
 Allan Havey as Pat Hagen
 Jo Harvey Allen as Barbara
 Ian Wolfe as Mr. D'Amato
 Billy Beck as Father Carmody
 Trudy Dochterman as Val (as Trudi Dochtermann)
 John Durbin as Spencer Gillinger
 Adelle Lutz as Dr. Helmsley
 Felton Perry as Dr. Duffin
 Allan Rich as Dr. Haskell
 Danton Stone as Dr. Wolfe

Reception
On Rotten Tomatoes the film has an approval rating of 20% based on reviews from 5 critics.

Roger Ebert of the Chicago Sun-Times gave the film 2 out of 4, and wrote: "The problem with Checking Out is that it provides us with fears we can understand and responses that seem to have been phoned in from a sitcom."

Home media

MGM released a full screen DVD in 2003. Image Entertainment released a new DVD of the film, as well as a Blu-ray of the film on January 18, 2011.

References

External links
 
 
 

1988 films
1988 comedy films
American comedy films
Films with screenplays by Joe Eszterhas
Warner Bros. films
Films scored by Carter Burwell
Films directed by David Leland
1980s English-language films
1980s American films